Robert Ogle  (1928–1998) was a Canadian priest, broadcaster and politician.

Robert Ogle may also refer to:

Robert de Ogle (c. 1305–1362), English feudal lord
Robert Ogle, 1st Baron Ogle (1406–1469), English feudal lord
Sir Robert Ogle (MP) (died 1436), English landowner, Member of Parliament and administrator
Bob Ogle (1926–1984), American voice actor, animator and writer